Between May 1955 and 1969 the professional wrestling promotion ABC Booking (later known as Georgia Championship Wrestling; GCW) promoted their own regional version of the NWA World Tag Team Championship, a professional wrestling championship for teams of two wrestlers. When the National Wrestling Alliance (NWA) was founded in 1948, its board of directors decided to allow any NWA member, referred to as an NWA territory, to use an NWA World Tag Team Championship within their region, essentially making it a regional championship despite the "World" label applied to it. Since the NWA World Tag Team Championships were professional wrestling championships, they were not won or lost in legitimate competitive matches but decided by booker(s) of a wrestling promotion instead.

The Georgia version of the NWA World Tag Team championship existed for 16 years. The fact that the board of directors did not put any limits on who could bill a championship as the NWA World Tag Team Championship led to at least 13 different championships of that name being used across the United States simultaneously at one point in 1957. Enrique Torres and Art Neilson are tied for the most championship reigns, 5 each with various partners, while the team of Enrique and his brother Ramon Torres and the team of The Von Brauners (Kurt and Karl) hold the record for reigns as a team, three each. Art Neilson and Eddie Gosset's second reign lasted at least 434 days, the longest reign in the championship's history.

The first recognized NWA World Tag Team Champions were the team of Reggie Lisowski and Art Neilson. At the time Lisowski and Neilson held the Chicago version of the championship which was brought to the Georgia territory. The Chicago version was used as the starting point of the Georgia lineage, creating a totally separate championship when Bill and Freddie Blassie won the Georgia version in December 1955, while Lisowski and Neilson remained champions in the Chicago region. In 1969 ABC Booking stopped using the championship, although they would recognize the Mid-Atlantic version after 1975. Instead the promotion would regularly promote the NWA Georgia Tag Team Championship and the NWA National Tag Team Championship as their primary championships.

Title history

Team reigns by combined length
Key

Individual reigns by combined length
Key

See also
National Wrestling Alliance
NWA World Tag Team Championship
Georgia Championship Wrestling

Footnotes

Concurrent championships
Sources for 13 simultaneous NWA World Tag Team Championships
NWA World Tag Team Championship (Los Angeles version)
NWA World Tag Team Championship (San Francisco version)
NWA World Tag Team Championship (Central States version)
NWA World Tag Team Championship (Chicago version)
NWA World Tag Team Championship (Buffalo Athletic Club version)
NWA World Tag Team Championship (Georgia version)
NWA World Tag Team Championship (Iowa/Nebraska version)
NWA World Tag Team Championship (Indianapolis version)
NWA World Tag Team Championship (Salt Lake Wrestling Club version)
NWA World Tag Team Championship (Amarillo version)
NWA World Tag Team Championship (Minneapolis version)
NWA World Tag Team Championship (Texas version)
NWA World Tag Team Championship (Mid-America version)

References

Georgia Championship Wrestling championships
National Wrestling Alliance championships
Professional wrestling in Georgia (U.S. state)
Tag team wrestling championships
World professional wrestling championships